The wearing of bicycle helmets and attitudes towards their use vary around the world. The effects of compulsory use of helmets are disputed (see Bicycle helmet laws). Only the four countries of Argentina, Cyprus, Australia, and New Zealand currently both require and enforce universal use of helmets by cyclists. In some other jurisdictions partial rules apply, such as only for children (e.g. in France), in certain states or sub-national divisions (e.g. British Columbia in Canada), or under other limited conditions.

Legislation by country
Australia was the first country to enact mandatory bicycle helmet use for all cyclists. Mexico City has had mandatory cycle helmet laws repealed, and in Italy the Federazione Italiana Amici della Bicicletta managed to block a proposed helmet law. While bicycle helmets are not required to be worn by law in the United Kingdom the British Medical Association advocates the compulsory use of helmets. Cycling UK, the largest cycling advocacy organisation in the UK, considers helmet wearing should be a personal choice rather than being mandated by legislation. In 2002 an attempt was made to introduce bicycle helmet legislation in Poland but it was opposed by cyclists' organisations.

See also
 Outline of cycling

Notes

References

Further reading

External links
European Cyclists’ Federation
Bicycle Helmet Research Foundation

laws by country
Bicycle law
Law by country